A full list of United States Navy LSTs. 
The Landing Ship, Tanks (LSTs) built for the United States Navy during and immediately after World War II were only given an LST-number hull designation, but on 1 July 1955, county or Louisiana-parish names were assigned to those ships which remained in service. More recent LSTs were named on launching.

By number

USS LST-1 – USS LST-84 

 USS LST-1
 USS LST-2
 USS LST-3
 USS LST-4
 USS LST-5
 USS LST-6
 USS LST-7
 USS LST-8
 USS LST-9
 USS LST-10 — converted to USS Achelous (ARL-1)
 USS LST-11
 USS LST-12
 USS LST-13
 USS LST-14 — converted to 
 USS LST-15 — converted to 
 USS LST-16
 USS LST-17
 USS LST-18
 USS LST-19
 USS LST-20
 USS LST-21
 USS LST-22
 USS LST-23
 USS LST-24
 USS LST-25
 USS LST-26
 USS LST-27
 USS LST-28
 USS LST-29
 USS LST-30
 USS Addison County (LST-31)
 USS Alameda County (LST-32)
 USS LST-33
 USS LST-34
 USS LST-35
 USS LST-36
 USS LST-37
 USS LST-38
 USS LST-39 — converted to YF-1079
 USS LST-40
 USS LST-41
 USS LST-42
 USS LST-43
 USS LST-44
 USS LST-45
 USS LST-46
 USS LST-47
 USS LST-48
 USS LST-49
 USS LST-50 — converted to USS ARB-13
 USS LST-51
 USS LST-52
 USS LST-53 — converted to 
 USS LST-54
 USS LST-55
 USS LST-56
 USS Armstrong County (LST-57)
 USS LST-58
 USS LST-59
 USS Atchison County (LST-60)
 USS LST-61
 USS LST-62
 USS LST-63
 USS LST-64
 USS LST-65
 USS LST-66
 USS LST-67
 USS LST-68
 USS LST-69
 USS LST-70
 USS LST-71
 USS LST-72
 USS LST-73
 USS LST-74
 USS LST-75
 USS LST-76
 USS LST-77
 USS LST-78
 USS LST-79
 USS LST-80
 USS LST-81 — converted to 
 USS LST-82 — converted to 
 USS LST-83 — converted to USS Adonis (ARL-4)
 USS LST-84
 LST-85 – LST-116 — cancelled

USS LST-117 – USS LST-199 

 USS LST-117
 USS LST-118
 USS LST-119
 USS LST-120
 USS LST-121
 USS LST-122
 USS LST-123
 USS LST-124
 USS LST-125
 USS LST-126
 USS LST-127
 USS LST-128
 USS LST-129 — converted to 
 USS LST-130
 USS LST-131
 USS LST-132 — converted to 
 USS LST-133
 USS LST-134
 USS LST-135 — converted to 
 USS LST-136 — converted to 
 USS LST-137
 USS LST-138
 USS LST-139
 USS LST-140
 USS LST-141
 LST-142 – LST-156 — cancelled
 USS LST-157
 USS LST-158
 USS LST-159
 USS LST-160
 USS LST-161
 USS LST-162
 USS LST-163
 USS LST-164
 USS LST-165
 USS LST-166
 USS LST-167
 USS LST-168
 USS LST-169
 USS LST-170
 USS LST-171
 USS LST-172
 USS LST-173
 USS LST-174
 USS LST-175
 USS LST-176
 USS LST-177
 USS LST-178
 USS LST-179
 USS LST-180
 USS LST-181
 LST-182 – LST-196 — cancelled
 USS LST-197
 USS LST-198
 USS LST-199

USS LST-200 – USS LST-299 

 USS LST-200
 USS LST-201 — converted to 
 USS LST-202
 USS LST-203
 USS LST-204
 USS LST-205
 USS LST-206
 USS LST-207
 USS LST-208
 USS Bamberg County (LST-209)
 USS LST-210
 USS LST-211
 USS LST-212
 USS LST-213
 USS LST-214
 USS LST-215
 USS LST-216
 USS LST-217
 USS LST-218
 USS LST-219
 USS LST-220
 USS LST-221
 USS LST-222
 USS LST-223
 USS LST-224
 USS LST-225
 USS LST-226
 USS LST-227
 USS LST-228
 USS LST-229
 USS LST-230
 USS LST-231 — converted to 
 LST-232 – LST-236 — cancelled
 USS LST-237
 USS LST-238
 USS LST-239
 USS LST-240
 USS LST-241
 USS LST-242
 USS LST-243
 USS LST-244
 USS LST-245
 USS LST-246
 USS LST-247
 LST-248 – LST-260 — cancelled
 USS LST-261
 USS LST-262
 USS Benton County (LST-263)
 USS LST-264
 USS LST-265
 USS Benzie County (LST-266)
 USS LST-267
 USS LST-268
 USS LST-269
 USS LST-270
 USS LST-271
 USS LST-272
 USS LST-273 — repatriated Japanese prisoners from Featherston prisoner of war camp
 USS LST-274
 USS LST-275 — repatriated Japanese prisoners from Featherston prisoner of war camp
 USS LST-276
 USS LST-277
 USS LST-278 — converted to USS Seaward (IX-209)
 USS Berkeley County (LST-279)
 USS LST-280
 USS LST-281
 USS LST-282
 USS LST-283
 USS LST-284
 USS LST-285
 USS LST-286
 USS LST-287
 USS Berkshire County (LST-288)
 USS LST-289
 USS LST-290
 USS LST-291
 USS LST-292
 USS LST-293
 USS LST-294
 USS LST-295
 LST-296 – LST-300 — cancelled
 USS LST-297
 USS LST-298
 USS LST-299

USS LST-300 – USS LST-399 

 USS LST-300 — cancelled
 USS LST-301
 USS LST-302
 USS LST-303
 USS LST-304
 USS LST-305
 USS Bernalillo County (LST-306)
 USS LST-307
 USS LST-308
 USS LST-309
 USS LST-310 — conversion to USS Aeolus (ARL-42) cancelled
 USS LST-311
 USS LST-312
 USS LST-313
 USS LST-314
 USS LST-315
 USS LST-316 — conversion to USS Cerberus (ARL-43) cancelled
 USS LST-317 — conversion to USS Conus (ARL-44) cancelled
 USS LST-318
 USS LST-319
 USS LST-320
 USS LST-321
 USS LST-322
 USS LST-323
 USS LST-324
 USS LST-325, the only restored, fully functional LST, now a museum ship with its home port in Evansville, Indiana.
 USS LST-326
 USS LST-327
 USS LST-328 — converted to 
 USS LST-329 — converted to USS Aristaeus (ARB-1)
 USS LST-330 — converted to 
 USS LST-331
 USS LST-332 — conversion to USS Feronia (ARL-45) cancelled
 USS LST-333
 USS LST-334
 USS LST-335
 USS LST-336
 USS LST-337
 USS LST-338
 USS LST-339
 USS LST-340 — converted to USS Spark (IX-196)
 USS LST-341
 USS LST-342
 USS LST-343
 USS Blanco County (LST-344)
 USS LST-345
 USS LST-346
 USS LST-347
 USS LST-348
 USS LST-349
 USS LST-350 — conversion to USS Chandra (ARL-46) cancelled
 USS LST-351
 USS LST-352
 USS LST-353
 USS LST-354
 USS LST-355
 USS Bledsoe County (LST-356)
 USS LST-357
 USS LST-358
 USS LST-359
 USS LST-360
 USS LST-361
 USS LST-362
 USS LST-363
 USS LST-364
 USS LST-365
 USS LST-366
 USS LST-367
 USS LST-368
 USS LST-369
 USS LST-370
 USS LST-371
 USS LST-372
 USS LST-373
 USS LST-374 — conversion to USS Minerva (ARL-47) cancelled
 USS LST-375
 USS LST-376
 USS LST-377
 USS LST-378
 USS LST-379
 USS LST-380
 USS LST-381
 USS LST-382
 USS LST-383
 USS LST-384
 USS LST-385
 USS LST-386
 USS LST-387
 USS LST-388
 USS Boone County (LST-389)
 USS LST-390
 USS Bowman County (LST-391)
 USS LST-392
 USS LST-393
 USS LST-394
 USS LST-395
 USS LST-396
 USS LST-397
 USS LST-398
 USS LST-399 — converted to USS Seaward (IX-511)

USS LST-400 – USS LST-499 

 USS Bradley County (LST-400)
 USS LST-401
 USS LST-402
 USS LST-403
 USS LST-404
 USS LST-405
 USS LST-406
 USS LST-407
 USS LST-408
 USS LST-409
 USS LST-410
 USS LST-411
 USS LST-412
 USS LST-413 (HM LST-413) — Sent to UK; saw no USN service
 USS LST-414
 USS LST-415
 USS LST-416
 USS LST-417
 USS LST-418
 USS LST-419
 USS LST-420
 USS LST-421
 USS LST-422
 USS LST-423
 USS LST-424
 USS LST-425
 USS LST-426
 USS LST-427
 USS LST-428
 USS LST-429
 USS LST-430
 LST-431 – LST-445 — cancelled
 USS LST-446
 USS LST-447
 USS LST-448
 USS LST-449
 USS LST-450
 USS LST-451
 USS LST-452
 USS LST-453 — converted to USS Remus (ARL-40)
 USS LST-454
 USS LST-455 — converted to USS Achilles (ARL-41)
 USS LST-456
 USS LST-457
 USS LST-458
 USS LST-459
 USS LST-460
 USS LST-461
 USS LST-462
 USS LST-463
 USS LST-464
 USS LST-465
 USS LST-466
 USS LST-467
 USS LST-468
 USS LST-469
 USS LST-470
 USS LST-471
 USS LST-472
 USS LST-473
 USS LST-474
 USS LST-475
 USS LST-476
 USS LST-477
 USS LST-478
 USS LST-479
 USS LST-480
 USS LST-481
 USS Branch County (LST-482)
 USS Brewster County (LST-483)
 USS LST-484
 USS LST-485
 USS LST-486
 USS LST-487
 USS LST-488
 USS LST-489 — converted to USS Amycus (ARL-2)
 USS LST-490 — converted to USS Agenor (ARL-3)
 USS LST-491
 USS LST-492
 USS LST-493
 USS LST-494
 USS LST-495
 USS LST-496
 USS LST-497
 USS LST-498
 USS LST-499

USS LST-500 – USS LST-599 

 
 
 
 
 USS Buchanan County (LST-504)
 
 
 
 
 
 USS Buncombe County (LST-510)
 
 USS Burnett County (LST-512)
 USS LST-513 — converted to 
 USS LST-514 — converted to 
 
 
 
 USS LST-518 — converted to 
 
 
 USS Cape May County (LST-521)
 
 
 
 
 
 
 USS Catahoula Parish (LST-528)
 
 USS LST-530
 USS LST-531
 
 
 
 USS LST-535
 USS LST-536
 USS LST-537
 USS LST-538
 USS LST-539
 USS LST-540
 USS LST-541
 
 USS LST-543
 USS LST-544
 USS LST-545
 USS LST-546
 USS LST-547
 USS LST-548
 USS LST-549
 USS LST-550
 
 USS LST-552
 USS LST-553
 USS LST-554
 USS LST-555
 USS LST-556
 USS LST-557
 USS LST-558
 USS LST-559
 USS LST-560
 
 USS LST-562
 USS LST-563
 USS LST-564
 USS LST-565
 USS LST-566
 USS LST-567
 USS LST-568
 USS LST-569
 USS LST-570
 USS LST-571
 USS LST-572
 USS LST-573
 USS LST-574
 USS LST-575
 USS LST-576
 USS LST-577
 USS LST-578
 USS LST-579
 USS LST-580
 USS LST-581
 USS LST-582
 
 USS LST-584
 USS LST-585
 USS LST-586
 USS LST-587
 USS LST-588
 USS LST-589
 USS LST-590
 USS LST-591
 USS LST-592
 USS LST-593
 USS LST-594
 USS LST-595
 USS LST-596
 USS LST-597
 USS LST-598
 USS LST-599

USS LST-600 – USS LST-699 

 
 
 
 
 USS LST-604 — converted to 
 
 
 
 
 
 
 
 
 
 
 
 
 
 
 
 
 
 
 
 
 
 
 
 
 
 
 
 
 
 
 
 
 
 
 
 
 
 
 
 USS LST-644 — converted to 
 USS LST-645 — converted to 
 
 
 
 
 USS LST-650 — converted to 
 
 
 
 
 
 
 
 
 
 
 
 
 
 
 
 
 
 
 
 
 
 
 
 
 
 
 USS LST-677 — converted to 
 
 
 
 
 
 
 
 
 
 
 
 USS Daggett County (LST-689)
 
 
 USS Daviess County (LST-692)

USS LST-700 – USS LST-799 

 
 
 
 
 
 
 
 
 
 
 USS LST-710 — converted to 
 
 
 
 
 
 
 
 
 
 
 
 
 
 
 
 
 
 
 
 
 
 
 
 
 
 
 
 
 
 
 
 
 
 
 
 
 
 
 
 
 
 
 
 
 
 
 
 
 USS Eddy County (LST-759)
 
 USS Esmeraldo County (LST-761)
 
 
 
 
 
 
 
 
 
 
 
 USS LST-773 — converted to 
 
 
 
 
 
 
 
 
 
 
 
 
 
 
 
 
 
 
 
 
 USS Gibson County (LST-794)

USS LST-800 – USS LST-899 

 
 
 USS Hamilton County (LST-802)
 
 
 
 
 
 
 
 
 
 
 
 
 
 
 
 
 
 
 USS Harnett County (LST-821)
 
 
 
 
 
 
 
 
 
 
   "The Mad Hooligan"
 
 
 USS Hillsdale County (LST-835)
 
 
 
 
 
 
 
 
 
 
 
 
 
 USS Johnson County (LST-849)
 USS Juniata County (LST-850)
 
 USS LST-852 — converted to 
 USS Kane County (LST-853)
 
 
 
 
 USS LST-858 — converted to 
 
 
 
 
 
 
 
 
 
 
 
 
 
 
 
 
 
 
 
 
 
 
 
 
 
 
 
 
 
 USS Lee County (LST-888)

USS LST-900 – USS LST-999 

 USS Linn County (LST-900)
 
 
 USS Lyman County (LST-903)
 USS Lyon County (LST-904)
 
 
 
 
 
 
 
 
 
 
 
 
 
 
 
 
 
 
 
 
 
 
 
 
 
 
 
 
 
 
 
 
 
 
 
 
 
 
 
 
 
 
 
 USS LST-948 — converted to 
 
 
 
 
 USS Marinette County (LST-953)
 USS LST-954 — converted to 
 USS LST-955 — converted to USS Patroclus (ARL-19)
 USS LST-956 — converted to 
  
 
 
 
 
 USS LST-962 — converted to 
 USS LST-963 — converted to 
 
 
 USS LST-966 — converted to 
 USS LST-967 — converted to 
 
 
 
 USS LST-971 — converted to 
 
 
 
 
 USS LST-976 — converted to 
 USS LST-977 — converted to USS Alecto (AGP-14)
 
 
 
 
 
 
 
 
 
 USS Millard County (LST-987)

USS LST-1000 – USS LST-1099 

 
 
 
 USS LST-1003 — converted to 
 
 
 
 
 
 
 
 
 
 
 
 
 
 
 
 
 
 
 
 
 
 
 
 
 
 
 
 
 
 
 
 
 USS LST-1036 — converted to 
 USS LST-1037 — converted to 
 USS Monroe County (LST-1038)
 
 
 
 
 
 
 
 
 
 
 
 
 
 
 
 
 
 
 
 
 
 
 
 
 
 USS Nansemond County (LST-1064)
 
 
 
 
 
 USS LST-1070 — converted to 
 
 
 
 
 
 
 
 USS LST-1078 — converted to 
 USS Payette County (LST-1079)
 
 USS Pima County (LST-1081)
 
 
 
 USS LST-1085 — converted to 
 USS Potter County (LST-1086)
 
 
 
 
 
 USS LST-1092 — converted to 
 USS LST-1093 — converted to 
 USS LST-1094 — converted to 
 USS LST-1095 — converted to 
 
 USS LST-1097 — converted to 
 USS LST-1098 — converted to 
 USS LST-1099 — converted to

USS LST-1100 – USS LST-1198 

 USS LST-1100 — converted to 
 USS Saline County (LST-1101)
 USS LST-1102 — converted to 
 
 
 
 
 
 
 
 
 USS LST-1111 — converted to USS Blackford (APB-45)
 USS LST-1112 — converted to 
 USS LST-1113 — converted to 
 USS LST-1114
 USS LST-1115 — converted to 
 USS LST-1116 — converted to 
 USS LST-1117 — converted to 
 USS LST-1118 — converted to 
 USS LST-1119 — converted to 
 USS LST-1120
 USS LST-1121 — converted to 
 
 
 USS LST-1124 — converted to 
 USS LST-1125 — converted to 
 
 USS LST-1127 — converted to 
 
 
 
 USS LST-1131 — converted to USS Askari (ARL-30)
 USS LST-1132 — converted to 
 USS LST-1133 — converted to 
 
 
 USS LST-1136 — converted to USS Bellona (ARL-32)
 USS LST-1137 — converted to 
 
 
 
 
 
 USS LST-1143 — converted to 
 
 USS LST-1145 — converted to 
 
 USS LST-1147 — converted to 
 
 USS LST-1149 — converted to 
 
 USS LST-1151 — converted to 
 
 
 
 USS LST-1155 — contract cancelled
 
 
 
 
 
 
 
 
 
 
 
 
 
 
 
 
 USS LST-1172 — contract cancelled
 
 USS Grant County (LST-1174)
 
 
 
 
 
 
 
 
 
 
 
 
 
 
 
 
 
 
 
 
 USS Barbour County (LST-1195)
 
 USS Barnstable County (LST-1197)

By class

LST-1 class

 USS LST-1
 USS LST-2
 USS LST-3
 USS LST-4
 USS LST-5
 USS LST-6
 USS LST-7
 USS LST-8
 USS LST-9
 USS LST-10, later ARL-1
 USS LST-11
 USS LST-12
 USS LST-13
 USS LST-14, later AGP-5
 USS LST-15, later ARB-3
 USS LST-16
 USS LST-17
 USS LST-18
 USS LST-19, later LSTH-19
 USS LST-20
 USS LST-21
 USS LST-22
 USS LST-23, later LSTH-23
 USS LST-24
 USS LST-25
 USS LST-26
 USS LST-27
 USS LST-28
 USS LST-29
 USS LST-30
 USS Addison County (LST-31)
 USS Alameda County (LST-32)
 USS LST-33
 USS LST-34
 USS LST-35
 USS LST-36
 USS LST-37
 USS LST-38, later LSTH-38
 USS LST-39, sunk in the West Loch disaster 21 May 1944, later YF-1079
 USS LST-40
 USS LST-41, later LSTH-41
 USS LST-42, later LSTH-42
 USS LST-43, sunk in the West Loch disaster 21 May 1944
 USS LST-44
 USS LST-45
 USS LST-46
 USS LST-47
 USS LST-48
 USS LST-49
 USS LST-50, later ARB-13
 USS LST-51
 USS LST-52
 USS LST-53, later APL-59
 USS LST-54
 USS LST-55
 USS LST-56
 USS Armstrong County (LST-57)
 USS LST-58
 USS LST-59
 USS Atchison County (LST-60)
 USS LST-61
 USS LST-62
 USS LST-63
 USS LST-64
 USS LST-65
 USS LST-66
 USS LST-67
 USS LST-68
 USS LST-69, sunk in the West Loch disaster 21 May 1944, no fatalities
 USS LST-70
 USS LST-71
 USS LST-72
 USS LST-73
 USS LST-74
 USS LST-75
 USS LST-76
 USS LST-77
 USS LST-78
 USS LST-79
 USS LST-80
 USS LST-81, later ARL-5
 USS LST-82, later ARL-6
 USS LST-83, later ARL-4
 USS LST-84, later LSTH-84
 LST-85 – LST-116, canceled
 USS LST-117, later LSTH-117
 USS LST-118, later LSTH-118
 USS LST-119
 USS LST-120
 USS LST-121, later LSTH-121
 USS LST-122
 USS LST-123, later LSTH-123
 USS LST-124
 USS LST-125
 USS LST-126
 USS LST-127
 USS LST-128
 USS LST-129, later IX-198
 USS LST-130
 USS LST-131
 USS LST-132, later ARB-4
 USS LST-133
 USS LST-134
 USS LST-135, later AGP-10
 USS LST-136, later ARL-8
 USS LST-137
 USS LST-138, later Altalena
 USS LST-139
 USS LST-140
 USS LST-141
 LST-142 – LST-156, canceled
 USS LST-157
 USS LST-158
 USS LST-159
 USS LST-160
 USS LST-161
 USS LST-162
 USS LST-163
 USS LST-164
 USS LST-165
 USS LST-166
 USS LST-167
 USS LST-168
 USS LST-169
 USS LST-170
 USS LST-171
 USS LST-172
 USS LST-173
 USS LST-174
 USS LST-175
 USS LST-176
 USS LST-177
 USS LST-178
 USS LST-179, sunk in the West Loch disaster 21 May 1944, no fatalities
 USS LST-180
 USS LST-181
 LST-182 – LST-196, canceled
 USS LST-197
 USS LST-198
 USS LST-199
 USS LST-200
 USS LST-201, later AGP-20
 USS LST-202
 USS LST-203
 USS LST-204
 USS LST-205, damaged in the West Loch disaster 21 May 1944, no fatalities, later LSTH-205
 USS LST-206
 USS LST-207
 USS LST-208
 USS Bamberg County (LST-209)
 USS LST-210
 USS LST-211
 USS LST-212
 USS LST-213, later LSTH-213
 USS LST-214
 USS LST-215
 USS LST-216
 USS LST-217
 USS LST-218
 USS LST-219
 USS LST-220
 USS LST-221
 USS LST-222, later LSTH-222
 USS LST-223
 USS LST-224
 USS LST-225, damaged in the West Loch disaster 21 May 1944, no fatalities
 USS LST-226
 USS LST-227
 USS LST-228
 USS LST-229
 USS LST-230
 USS LST-231, later ARL-7
 LST-232 – LST-236, canceled
 USS LST-237
 USS LST-238
 USS LST-239
 USS LST-240
 USS LST-241
 USS LST-242, later LSTH-242
 USS LST-243, later LSTH-243
 USS LST-244
 USS LST-245
 USS LST-246
 USS LST-247, later LSTH-247
 LST-248 – LST-260, canceled
 USS LST-261
 USS LST-262
 USS Benton County (LST-263)
 USS LST-264
 USS LST-265
 USS Benzie County (LST-266)
 USS LST-267
 USS LST-268, later LSTH-268
 USS LST-269
 USS LST-270
 USS LST-271
 USS LST-272
 USS LST-273, repatriated Japanese prisoners from Featherston prisoner of war camp
 USS LST-274, damaged in the West Loch disaster 21 May 1944, no fatalities
 USS LST-275, repatriated Japanese prisoners from Featherston prisoner of war camp
 USS LST-276, later LSTH-276
 USS LST-277
 USS LST-278, later IX-209
 USS Berkeley County (LST-279)
 USS LST-280
 USS LST-281
 USS LST-282
 USS LST-283
 USS LST-284
 USS LST-285
 USS LST-286
 USS LST-287
 USS Berkshire County (LST-288)
 USS LST-289, damaged in Exercise Tiger, 28 April 1944, 13 fatalities
 USS LST-290
 USS LST-291
 USS LST-292
 USS LST-293
 USS LST-294
 USS LST-295
 LST-296 – LST-300, canceled
 USS LST-297
 USS LST-298
 USS LST-299
 USS LST-300, canceled
 USS LST-301
 USS LST-302
 USS LST-303
 USS LST-304
 USS LST-305
 USS Bernalillo County (LST-306)
 USS LST-307
 USS LST-308
 USS LST-309
 USS LST-310, ARL-42 conversion canceled
 USS LST-311
 USS LST-312
 USS LST-313
 USS LST-314
 USS LST-315
 USS LST-316, ARL-43 conversion canceled
 USS LST-317, ARL-44 conversion canceled
 USS LST-318
 USS LST-319
 USS LST-320
 USS LST-321
 USS LST-322
 USS LST-323
 USS LST-324
 USS LST-325, Brodie landing system installed, museum ship in Evansville, Indiana.
 USS LST-326
 USS LST-327
 USS LST-328, later ARB-2
 USS LST-329, later ARB-1
 USS LST-330, later AGP-4
 USS LST-331
 USS LST-332, ARL-45 conversion cancelled
 USS LST-333
 USS LST-334
 USS LST-335
 USS LST-336
 USS LST-337
 USS LST-338
 USS LST-339
 USS LST-340, beached, later IX-196
 USS LST-341
 USS LST-342
 USS LST-343
 USS Blanco County (LST-344)
 USS LST-345
 USS LST-346
 USS LST-347
 USS LST-348
 USS LST-349
 USS LST-350, ARL-46 conversion cancelled
 USS LST-351
 USS LST-352
 USS LST-353, sunk in the West Loch disaster 21 May 1944
 USS LST-354
 USS LST-355
 USS Bledsoe County (LST-356)
 USS LST-357
 USS LST-358
 USS LST-359
 USS LST-360
 USS LST-361
 USS LST-362
 USS LST-363
 USS LST-364
 USS LST-365
 USS LST-366
 USS LST-367
 USS LST-368
 USS LST-369
 USS LST-370
 USS LST-371
 USS LST-372
 USS LST-373
 USS LST-374, ARL-47 conversion cancelled
 USS LST-375
 USS LST-376
 USS LST-377
 USS LST-378
 USS LST-379
 USS LST-380
 USS LST-381
 USS LST-382
 USS LST-383
 USS LST-384
 USS LST-385
 USS LST-386
 USS LST-387
 USS LST-388
 USS Boone County (LST-389)
 USS LST-390
 USS Bowman County (LST-391)
 USS LST-392
 USS LST-393, Brodie landing system installed
 USS LST-394
 USS LST-395
 USS LST-396
 USS LST-397
 USS LST-398
 USS LST-399, later IX-511
 USS Bradley County (LST-400)
 USS LST-401
 USS LST-402
 USS LST-403
 USS LST-404
 USS LST-405
 USS LST-406
 USS LST-407
 USS LST-408
 USS LST-409
 USS LST-410
 USS LST-411
 USS LST-412
 USS LST-413
 USS LST-414
 USS LST-415
 USS LST-416
 USS LST-417
 USS LST-418
 USS LST-419
 USS LST-420
 USS LST-421
 USS LST-422
 USS LST-423
 USS LST-424
 USS LST-425
 USS LST-426
 USS LST-427
 USS LST-428
 USS LST-429
 USS LST-430
 LST-431, canceled
 USS LST-446
 USS LST-447, sunk by kamikaze Okinawa 7 April 1945
 USS LST-448
 USS LST-449
 USS LST-450, later LSTH-450
 USS LST-451
 USS LST-452
 USS LST-453, later ARL-40
 USS LST-454
 USS LST-455, later ARL-41
 USS LST-456
 USS LST-457
 USS LST-458
 USS LST-459
 USS LST-460
 USS LST-461
 USS LST-462
 USS LST-463
 USS LST-464, later LSTH-464
 USS LST-465
 USS LST-466
 USS LST-467
 USS LST-468
 USS LST-469
 USS LST-470
 USS LST-471
 USS LST-472
 USS LST-473
 USS LST-474
 USS LST-475
 USS LST-476
 USS LST-477, later LSTH-477
 USS LST-478
 USS LST-479
 USS LST-480, sunk in the West Loch disaster 21 May 1944
 USS LST-481
 USS Branch County (LST-482), later LSTH-482
 USS Brewster County (LST-483)
 USS LST-484
 USS LST-485
 USS LST-486, later LSTH-486
 USS LST-487
 USS LST-488, later LSTH-488
 USS LST-489 , later ARL-2
 USS LST-490 , later ARL-3

LST-491 class

 USS LST-491
 USS LST-492
 USS LST-493
 USS LST-494
 USS LST-495
 USS LST-496
 USS LST-497
 USS LST-498
 USS LST-499
 
 
 
 
 USS Buchanan County (LST-504)
 
 
 , sunk in Exercise Tiger, 28 April 1944, 202 fatalities
 
 
 USS Buncombe County (LST-510)
 , damaged in Exercise Tiger, 28 April 1944, no fatalities
 USS Burnett County (LST-512)
 USS LST-513, later ARL-9
 USS LST-514, later ARB-5
 
 
 
 USS LST-518, later ARB-6
 
 
 USS Cape May County (LST-521)
 
 
 
 
 
 
 USS Catahoula Parish (LST-528)
 
 USS LST-530
 USS LST-531, sunk in Exercise Tiger, 28 April 1944, 424 fatalities
 
 
 , damaged by kamikaze Okinawa 22 June 1945
 USS LST-535
 USS LST-536
 USS LST-537
 USS LST-538
 USS LST-539
 USS LST-540
 USS LST-541

LST-542 class

 
 USS LST-543
 USS LST-544
 USS LST-545
 USS LST-546
 USS LST-547
 USS LST-548
 USS LST-549
 USS LST-550
 
 USS LST-552
 USS LST-553
 USS LST-554
 USS LST-555
 USS LST-556
 USS LST-557
 USS LST-558
 USS LST-559
 USS LST-560
 
 USS LST-562
 USS LST-563
 USS LST-564
 USS LST-565
 USS LST-566
 USS LST-567
 USS LST-568, wrecked by Typhoon Louise Okinawa October 1945
 USS LST-569
 USS LST-570
 USS LST-571
 USS LST-572
 USS LST-573
 USS LST-574
 USS LST-575
 USS LST-576
 USS LST-577
 USS LST-578
 USS LST-579
 USS LST-580
 USS LST-581
 USS LST-582
 
 USS LST-584
 USS LST-585
 USS LST-586
 USS LST-587
 USS LST-588
 USS LST-589
 USS LST-590
 USS LST-591
 USS LST-592
 USS LST-593
 USS LST-594
 USS LST-595
 USS LST-596
 USS LST-597
 USS LST-598
 USS LST-599, damaged by kamikaze Okinawa 2 April 1945
 
 
 
 
 USS LST-604, later AGP-11
 
 
 
 
 
 
 
 
 
 
 
 
 
 
 
 
 
 
 
 
 
 
 
 
 
 
 
 
 
 
 
 
 
 
 
 
 
 
 
 USS LST-644, later ARL-14
 USS LST-645, later ARL-15
 
 
 
 
 USS LST-650, later ARL-18
 
 , later LSTH-652
 
 
 
 
 
 
 
 
 
 
 
 
 
 
 
 
 
 
 
 
 
 
 
 
 USS LST-677, later APB-43
 
 
 
 
 
 
 
 
 
 
 
 USS Daggett County (LST-689)
 
 
 USS Daviess County (LST-692)
 
 
 
 
 
 
 
 , damaged by kamikaze Lingayen Gulf 17 & 18 January 1945
 
 
 
 
 
 
 
 
 
 USS LST-710, later APB-49
 
 
 
 
 
 
 
 
 
 
 
 
 
 
 
 
 
 
 
 
 , later LSTH-731
 
 
 
 
 
 
 
 
 
 
 
 
 
 
 
 
 
 
 
 
 
 
 
 
 
 
 
 USS Eddy County (LST-759)
 
 USS Esmeraldo County (LST-761)
 
 
 
 
 
 
 
 
 
 
 
 USS LST-773, later AGP-16
 
 
 , Brodie landing system installed
 
 
 
 
 
 
 
 
 
 
 
 
 
 , later LSTH-790
 
 
 
 USS Gibson County (LST-794)
 
 
 
 
 
 
 
 USS Hamilton County (LST-802)
 
 
 
 
 
 , sunk by air attack Okinawa 18 May 1945
 
 
 
 
 
 
 
 
 
 
 
 
 USS Harnett County (LST-821)
 
 
 
 
 , wrecked by Typhoon Louise Okinawa October 1945
 
 
 
 
 
 
 
 
 USS Hillsdale County (LST-835)
 
 
 
 
 
 
 
 
 
 
 
 
 
 USS Johnson County (LST-849)
 USS Juniata County (LST-850)
 
 USS LST-852, later ARL-23
 USS Kane County (LST-853)
 
 
 
 , later AG-157 Regulus II test launcher
 USS LST-858, later ARL-26
 
 
 
 
 
 
 
 
 
 
 
 
 , later LSTH-871
 
 
 
 
 
 
 
 
 
 
 
 
 , scuttled after 1 April 1945 kamikaze attack, 6 May
 
 
 
 USS Lee County (LST-888)
 
 
 
 
 
 
 
 
 
 
 
 USS Linn County (LST-900)
 
 
 USS Lyman County (LST-903)
 USS Lyon County (LST-904)
 
 
 
 
 
 
 
 , damaged by kamikaze Lingayen Gulf 8 January 1945
 
 
 
 
 
 
 
 
 
 
 
 
 
 
 
 
 , later LSTH-929
 , later LSTH-930
 , later LSTH-931
 
 
 
 
 
 
 
 
 
 
 
 
 
 
 
 
 USS LST-948, later ARL-16
 , later LSTH-949
 , later LSTH-950
 , later LSTH-951
 , later LSTH-952
 USS Marinette County (LST-953)
 USS LST-954, later ARL-17
 USS LST-955, later ARL-19
 USS LST-956, later ARB-7
  
 
 
 
 
 USS LST-961, later ARL-22
 USS LST-962, later ARL-24
 
 
 USS LST-966, later AGP-15
 USS LST-967, later ARB-9
 
 
 
 USS LST-971, later ARL-13
 
 
 
 
 USS LST-976, later ARB-9
 USS LST-977, later AGP-14
 
 
 
 
 
 
 
 
 
 USS Millard County (LST-987)
 
 
 
 
 
 
 
 
 
 
 
 
 
 
 
 USS LST-1003, later ARL-10
 
 
 
 
 
 
 
 
 
 
 
 
 
 
 
 
 
 
 
 
 
 
 
 
 
 
 
 
 
 , later LSTH-1033
 
 
 USS LST-1036, later ARL-11
 USS LST-1037, later ARL-12
 USS Monroe County (LST-1038)
 
 
 
 
 
 
 
 
 
 
 
 
 
 
 
 
 
 
 
 
 
 
 
 
 
 USS Nansemond County (LST-1064)
 
 
 
 
 , later MCS-6
 USS LST-1070, later AG-146, AKS-27
 
 
 
 
 
 
 
 USS LST-1078, later AG-147, AKS-28
 USS Payette County (LST-1079)
 
 USS Pima County (LST-1081)
 
 
 
 USS LST-1085, later AG-148, AKS-29
 USS Potter County (LST-1086)
 
 
 
 
 
 USS LST-1092, later ARVE-3
 USS LST-1093, later ARVA-5
 USS LST-1094, later ARVE-4
 USS LST-1095. later ARVA-6
 
 USS LST-1097, later AG-149, AKS-30
 USS LST-1098, later ARST-1
 USS LST-1099, later ARST-2
 USS LST-1100, later ARST-3
 USS Saline County (LST-1101)
 USS LST-1102, later AG-150, AKS-31
 
 
 
 
 
 
 
 
 USS LST-1111, later APB-45
 USS LST-1112, later APB-46
 USS LST-1113, later APB-47
 USS LST-1114
 USS LST-1115, later ARL-20
 USS LST-1116, later ARL-21
 USS LST-1117, later ARL-27
 USS LST-1118, later ARL-28
 USS LST-1119, later ARB-11
 USS LST-1120
 USS LST-1121, later ARB-10
 
 
 USS LST-1124, later ARL-29
 USS LST-1125, later AGP-17
 
 USS LST-1127, later ARB-12
 
 
 
 USS LST-1131, later ARL-30
 USS LST-1132, later ARL-31
 USS LST-1133, later AGP-18
 
 
 USS LST-1136, later ARL-32
 USS LST-1137, later ARL-33
 
 
 
 
 
 USS LST-1143, later ARL-35
 
 USS LST-1145, later ARL-36
 
 USS LST-1147, later ARL-37
 
 USS LST-1149, later ARL-38
 
 USS LST-1151, later ARL-39

Talbot County-class

Talbot County-class

Served 1947 - 1970.
 
 , later AVB-2
 USS LST-1155 — contract cancelled

Terrebonne Parish-class

Terrebonne Parish-class

Served 1952 - 1973.

 
 
 
 
 
 
 
 
 
 
 , later MSS-2

De Soto County-class

De Soto County-class

Served 1957 - 1973.

 
 USS LST-1172 — contract cancelled
 
 USS Grant County (LST-1174)

Newport-class

Newport-class

Served 1969 - 2002.

 
 
 
 
 
 
 
 
 
 
 
 
 
 
 
 , grounded Caleta Cifuncho Bay, Chile, 12 September 2000, CTL
 USS Barbour County (LST-1195)
 
 USS Barnstable County (LST-1197)

By name

USS Addison County – USS Curry County 

 USS Addison County (LST-31)
 USS Alameda County (LST-32)
 USS Armstrong County (LST-57)
 USS Atchison County (LST-60)
 USS Bamberg County (LST-209)
 USS Barbour County (LST-1195)
 USS Barnstable County (LST-1197)
 USS Benton County (LST-263)
 USS Benzie County (LST-266)
 USS Berkeley County (LST-279)
 USS Berkshire County (LST-288)
 USS Bernalillo County (LST-306)
 USS Blanco County (LST-344)
 USS Bledsoe County (LST-356)
 USS Boone County (LST-389)
 
 USS Bowman County (LST-391)
 USS Bradley County (LST-400)
 USS Branch County (LST-482)
 USS Brewster County (LST-483)
 
 USS Buchanan County (LST-504)
 
 USS Buncombe County (LST-510)
 USS Burnett County (LST-512)
 
 
 
 USS Cape May County (LST-521)
 
 
 USS Catahoula Parish (LST-528)
 USS Cayuga (LST-1186)

USS Daggett County – USS King County 

 USS Daggett County (LST-689)
 USS Daviess County (LST-692)
 
 
 
 
 
 
 
 USS Eddy County (LST-759)
 USS Esmeraldo County (LST-761)
 
 
 
 
 
 
 
 USS ''Gibson County (LST-794)
 
 USS Grant County (LST-1174)
 
 USS Hamilton County (LST-802)
 
 
 
 USS Harnett County (LST-821)
 USS Harris County (LST-822)
 
 
 
 USS Hillsdale County (LST-835)
 
 
 
 
 
 
 
 USS Johnson County (LST-849)
 USS Juniata County (LST-850)
 USS Kane County (LST-853)

USS Lafayette County – USS Pulaski County 

 
 
 
 
 
 USS Lee County (LST-888)
 
 USS Linn County (LST-900)
 
 
 
 USS Lyman County (LST-903)
 USS Lyon County (LST-904)
 
 
 
 
 
 USS Marinette County (LST-953)
 
 
 
 USS Millard County (LST-987)
 
 
 USS Monroe County (LST-1038)
 
 
 USS Nansemond County (LST-1064)
 
 
 
 
 
 
 
 USS Overton County (LST-1074)
 
 
 USS Payette County (LST-1079)
 
 
 USS Pima County (LST-1081)

USS Racine County – USS York County

By shipyard 

 Data is based on p. 4 of Role of the LSTs (Landing Ship Tank) in WW II Amphibious Operations from National Park Service.

See also
 List of LSTs
 List of US Navy ships sunk or damaged in action during World War II § Landing ship, tank (LST)

References

NavSource Online: Tank Landing Ship (LST) Index

Landing Ship Tank (LST)